Tallinna Kalev/TLÜ or also known as Tallina Kalev/Audentes for sponsorship reasons, is a professional basketball club based in Tallinn, Estonia. The team plays in the Latvian-Estonian Basketball League and Korvpalli Meistriliiga (KML). Their home arena is the Audentes Sports Centre.

History
The team was founded in 2002 as Pirita. Coached by Kalle Klandorf, the team joined the top-tier Korvpalli Meistriliiga (KML) in the 2002–03 season. In 2002, Pirita reached the Estonian Cup final, but were defeated by University of Tartu 76–92.

In 2008, Pirita joined the multi-sport club Kalev. The team adopted the name Tallinna Kalev prior to the 2008–09 season. The team signed power forward Travis Reed for the 2009–10 season, while former Estonia national team coach Üllar Kerde joined the coaching staff.

In 2010, the team merged with TTÜ, the latter becoming TTÜ/Kalev, while Tallinna Kalev became TTÜ/Kalev II. Both teams competed in the 2010–11 KML season and the 2010–11 Baltic Basketball League. The unified team dissolved after the 2010–11 season and both clubs continued separately.

Prior to the 2014–15 season, the team signed an agreement with Tallinn University and adopted the name Tallinna Kalev/TLÜ.

Home arenas
Pirita TOP Sports Centre (2002–2004)
Pirita Business School Sports Hall (2004–2009)
Kalev Sports Hall (2009–2010)
TTÜ Sports Hall (2010–2011)
Kalev Sports Hall (2011–2016)
Audentes Sports Centre (2016–2017)
Kalev Sports Hall (2017–2018)
Sõle Sports Centre (2018–2022)
Nord Cramo Sports Hall (2021–2022)
Audentes Sports Centre (2022–present)

Players

Current roster

Depth chart

Coaches

Kalle Klandorf 2002–2010
Indrek Reinbok 2010–2012
Kalle Klandorf 2012–2017
Raido Roos 2017

Kalle Klandorf 2017–2018
Gert Kullamäe 2018–2019
Martin Müürsepp 2019–2021
Valdo Lips 2021

Brett Nõmm 2021–2022
Rauno Pehka 2022–present

Season by season

Trophies and awards
Estonian Championship
Runners-up (1): 2019

Estonian Cup
Runners-up (1): 2002

Individual awards

Newcomer of the Year
Martin Müürsepp – 2019

All-KML Team
Erki Kivinukk – 2004
Damarcus Harrison – 2019

References

External links
 Official website

Basketball teams established in 2002
Tallinna Kalev
Sport in Tallinn
Korvpalli Meistriliiga